Irfan Khan (Pashto: عرفان خان) is a Pakistani Pashtun pop singer singing in both Pashto and Urdu. His claim to fame came with the release of a Pashto single "Pekhawar Khu Pekhawar De" which translates into "Peshawar Is Peshawar", a song he wrote in a tribute to his hometown. He recently recorded a single with Hadiqa Kiyani called "Jaanan". "Jaanan" was Irfan's title song from his Album by the same name. "Jaanan" proved to be a superhit song all over Pakistan in 2010. It even made it to the Los Angeles Times' "What they are..." section.

Background
Irfan Khan was born on May 5, 1982 in Mardan, Khyber Pakhtunkhwa, Pakistan. his father worked as a Manager for a Pakistani Bank. Irfan started his education at the age of 6 in Swat and later on in Azad Kashmir. He did his Matriculation examination (10th grade) from Peshawar Model School, intermediate examinations (12th grade) from Edwardes College, Peshawar and got his BA Degree in Communication Design from the University of Peshawar and degree in hospitality and hotel management.

Career
From the epoch of schooling he took part in Naat competitions. In college, he realized his passion for music, where he started exploring Pashto music. Fortunately this was the beginning of new era in Pashtun media. He recorded his first Pashto single "Pekhawar Khu Pekhawar de" which Khyber TV broadcast, and which became an instant hit and put Irfan in the growing Pashto music scene.

Irfan went on to record his first Pashto album "Brekhna" which was very well received within the Pashtun community in Pakhtunkhwa and overseas. The songs soon emerged all over internet and were downloaded all around the world.  His song "Zema De Stergo Na Panaa Gulaba" was especially well received overseas, which describes the longing of expatriates for their homeland.

Irfan went on to participate on various television shows and live performances including a solo concert in Boston and in Kuala Lumpur.

Chounay Day
Irfan has also launched his first Urdu album "Chounay Day". The songs are composed and recorded in Karachi, Lahore and Islamabad. He also recorded a video for the title song from this Album in Atlanta. And he has recorded a video of the song "Janaan" with Hadiqa Kiani.

References

External links

Irfan Khan mentioned in Times of India Article "Dying notes: Music goes out of Peshawar as artists face militants’ ire"
Irfan Khan mentioned in article on Radio Free Europe Radio Library Article "Taliban Has Failed To Kill Pashtun Musical Spirit"
Irfan khan mentioned in French book des reves plein le monde
Irfan khan interview with Express tribune
https://www.bbc.com/pashto/news/story/2007/08/070831_mmn_

1982 births
Living people
Pashto-language singers
Pakistani expatriates in the United Arab Emirates
Pakistani pop singers
Pakistani male singers
Pashtun people
People from Peshawar
University of Peshawar alumni